Cheyenne Goh (born March 2, 1999) is a Singaporean short track speed skater.

Career
Goh achieved her highest rank in a World Cup event, by placing 18th in the 500m event in Calgary.

Goh became the first female short track speed skater from Singapore to compete at the World Championships.

Goh won three medals at the 2017 Southeast Asian Games in Kuala Lumpur, Malaysia. Goh took the bronze medal in the 500m event and silvers in the 1000m and 3000m relay events.

Goh became the first athlete representing Singapore to qualify for the Winter Olympics. Goh did this by being ranked in the top 36 in the 1,500 metres event over four world cups. She competed at the women's 1500m short track speed skating event at the 2018 Winter Olympics on 17 February 2018, where she did not advance out of the qualifiers.

Personal bests
500m: 45.333
1000m: 1:36.674

See also
 Singapore at the 2018 Winter Olympics

References

External links
 
 
 

1999 births
Living people
Singaporean female short track speed skaters
Olympic short track speed skaters of Singapore
Short track speed skaters at the 2018 Winter Olympics
Southeast Asian Games silver medalists for Singapore
Southeast Asian Games bronze medalists for Singapore
Southeast Asian Games medalists in short track speed skating
Short track speed skaters at the 2017 Asian Winter Games
Singaporean female speed skaters
Competitors at the 2017 Southeast Asian Games
Competitors at the 2019 Southeast Asian Games
Southeast Asian Games gold medalists for Singapore
Singaporean sportspeople of Chinese descent